The Temple Owls women's basketball team represents Temple University in women's basketball. The school competes in the American Athletic Conference in Division I of the National Collegiate Athletic Association (NCAA). The Owls play home basketball games at the Liacouras Center in Philadelphia, Pennsylvania.

Season-by-season record
As of the 2015–16 season, the Owls have an 805–657 record. They have made 10 appearances in the NCAA Tournament (1989, 2002, 2004, 2006, 2007, 2008, 2009, 2010, 2011), with a 5–10 record. They previously played in the Atlantic-10 Conference from 1983 to 2013. They have also made 6 appearances in the Women's National Invitation Tournament (WNIT) (1982, 1983, 2001, 2012, 2015, 2016). They have also finished as the Philadelphia Big 5 champions in 1983, 1986, 2002, 2005, 2006, 2007, 2008, 2009 (co-champ), and 2011.

NCAA tournament results

References

External links